MLB Home Run Derby X, known for sponsorship reasons as FTX MLB Home Run Derby X, is a global baseball tour operated by Major League Baseball (MLB). Its first edition was in 2022. It is based on the Home Run Derby that is usually contested the day before the MLB All-Star Game.

2022 edition

Teams represented the Los Angeles Dodgers, the Boston Red Sox, the Chicago Cubs, and the New York Yankees. Teams included former MLB players, players from softball and women's baseball, rookies from the men's baseball development system, and "influential content creators". Adrián González played for the Dodgers, Jonny Gomes for the Red Sox, Nick Swisher for the Yankees, and Geovany Soto for the Cubs.

The 2022 event consisted of three legs: one in London, one in Seoul, and one in Mexico City. Each leg consisted of a single-elimination bracket with a third place playoff for classification. Teams received five points for winning a leg, three points for second place, and one point for third place. Cryptocurrency exchange company FTX was the title sponsor, in continuation of a partnership with MLB announced in mid-2021.

The Red Sox won the 2022 tournament.

London

The London leg was held at Crystal Palace Park on July 9. AJ Tracey headlined the event, described as "baseball meets festival vibes". Zach Stroman, who has played for the London Mets, represented the Dodgers at the event.

In the final, the Yankees defeated the Red Sox, 42–41, after London-born Richard Brereton hit a walk-off home run. Erika Piancastelli of the Yankees was named MVP of the London tournament. In the third-place game, the Dodgers defeated the Cubs, 53–38.

Seoul

The Seoul leg was held on September 17 at Paradise City.

In the preliminaries, the Red Sox defeated the Yankees 60–49, while the Dodgers defeated the Cubs 55–54.  In the finals, the Dodgers defeated the Red Sox 60–55.  Adrian Gonzalez was named MVP on the day.

Mexico City

The Mexico City leg was held on October 15 at Campo Marte.

In the preliminaries, the Red Sox defeated the Cubs 62–51, while the Dodgers defeated the Yankees 68–63. In the finals, the Red Sox defeated the Dodgers 57–56.  Jocelyn Alo was named site MVP.

Standings 

Source:

References

External links
 

Sports entertainment
Sports leagues established in 2022
Major League Baseball international baseball competitions